Gloria Randle Scott (born Gloria Dean on April 14, 1938 in Houston, Texas) is an American educator and the first African-American to be elected as president of the Girl Scouts of the USA.

Born and raised in Texas, in 1959 Scott became the first African-American to receive a degree in zoology from Indiana University. She also received a Ph.D. in Higher Education from Indiana in 1965.   She was president of the Girl Scouts from 1975 to 1978 and remains on the Board of Directors.  She was president of Bennett College, serving from 1987 until in 2001. In 1993, Gloria Randall Scott was elected to the Common Cause National Governing Board.

Scott is a member of Delta Sigma Theta sorority.

Scott was featured in Pulitzer-Prize-winning-photographer Brian Lanker’s 1989 photobook I Dream A World: Portraits of Black Women who Changed America.

See also

Juliette Gordon Low

References

1938 births
African-American academics
Girl Scouts of the USA people
Living people
Indiana University alumni
Bennett College faculty
Delta Sigma Theta members
21st-century African-American people
20th-century African-American people